William Thomas Newsome (born June 5, 1952) is a neuroscientist at Stanford University who works to "understand the neuronal processes that mediate visual perception and visually guided behavior."  He is a member of the National Academy of Sciences. 

According to an article in PNAS, "What sets Newsome's research apart from many other studies in this area is that the techniques he uses—primarily, stimulation of brain areas of primates with microelectrodes—have helped demonstrate cause and effect rather than merely show a correlation between behavior and activity of the brain."

Personal life

Newsome is a Christian.

Awards
 Howard Hughes Medical Institute Investigator (1997– Present)
 Member National Academy of Sciences (2000)
 Member, Society for Neuroscience
 Member, American Philosophical Society
 António Champalimaud Vision Award, (2010)
 Karl Spencer Lashley Award, American Philosophical Society (2010)
 Distinguished Scientific Contribution Award, American Psychological Association
 Dan David Prize, Tel Aviv University (2004)
 W. Alden Spencer Award, Columbia University (1994)
 Rank Prize in Opto-electronics, Rank Prize Funds, London
Pepose Award in Vision Science (2015)

Publications
His publications include:
 "A selective impairment of motion perception following lesions of the middle temporal visual area" The Journal of Neuroscience (1988)
 "Neuronal correlates of a perceptual decision" Nature (1989)
 "Correlated neuronal discharge rate and its implications for psychophysical performance" Nature (1994)
 "Noise, neural codes and cortical organization" Current Opinion in Biology (1994)
 "The variable discharge of cortical neurons: implications for connectivity, computation, and information coding" The Journal of Neuroscience (1998)

See also
 Two-alternative forced choice

Notes and references

1952 births
Living people
People from Florida
American neuroscientists
Howard Hughes Medical Investigators
Stanford University School of Medicine faculty
Members of the United States National Academy of Sciences